Zumiez Inc. is an American multinational specialty clothing store founded by Thomas Campion and Gary Haakenson in 1978, and publicly traded since 2005. The company is a specialty retailer of apparel, footwear, accessories and hardgoods for young men and women. Zumiez markets clothing for action sports, particularly skateboarding, snowboarding, and motocross. Zumiez is based in Lynnwood, Washington.
The current president and CEO is Richard Brooks.

Originally named "Above the Belt" when the first store was opened at Northgate Mall (Seattle) in 1978, the company grew quickly through the early 1980s with the addition of stores at Everett Mall (Everett, Washington), Alderwood Mall (Lynnwood, WA), Tacoma Mall (Tacoma, WA) and Bellevue Square (Bellevue, WA). The mid and late eighties brought new stores online outside of the Puget Sound area, and the corporate name changed to Zumiez. The corporate office was moved from Everett to Lynnwood, Washington in 2012.

Stores
As of February 3, 2018, Zumiez operates 726 stores; 608 in the United States, 52 in Canada, 54 in Europe and 12 in Australia. Zumiez is a leading retailer for lifestyle brands, centering on action sports such as skateboarding, snowboarding, BMX, and motocross.

Store design
Zumiez stores are designed with an "organized chaos" theme "that is consistent with many teenagers' lifestyles." The stores are stocked with couches  to encourage customers "to shop for longer periods of time and to interact with each other and the store associates." To further benefit that thought stores used to have video game stations where customers could chill and spend more time in the store. Each store is approx. 2,900 ft2. The stores generally feature a sales floor, couches and action sports oriented video game stations, changing rooms, and a "skate shop." However, this plan may be modified based on space restrictions.

Items for sale  
Zumiez is targeted toward teens, offering clothing items such as footwear, shirts, pants and sporting equipment. The Sporting equipment they offer is for BMX bikes, skateboards, and surfboards. The clothing offered is for both men and women, with brands sold such as Vans, Burton, Obey, Teddy Fresh, and RipNDip, as well as private-label goods. Selling items in stores and online, Zumiez offers clothing for all seasons including jackets and swimsuits. They also sell items such as bracelets, watches, sunglasses, and stickers. A full list of brands that Zumiez sells in-store and online can be found on their featured brands list.

Couch Tour
For 13 years, Zumiez traveled to 12 "full stops" as part of its annual Couch Tour. Entertainment included live bands, professional skateboarding demos, and a competition featuring local amateurs. The stops usually took place at the mall where local Zumiez stores are located. Entry to the event was always free.

As part of the Couch tour, since Zumiez doesn't sponsor riders themselves, they joined up with major players in the skate industry to offer an opportunity where amateur skaters can enter and compete. 2013 sponsors included Bones Bearings, Paramore, Beyonce, Adidas, Deathwish, DGK, Neff, Oakley, and Loser Machine providing the "trophies" for each stop of the contest's winners.

Best Foot Forward

Zumiez Best Foot Forward Am contest series started in 2007 to give back to the skateboarding community on a local level, providing the country's biggest amateur skateboard contest and exposure on a global level. Differentiating itself from other contests, Zumiez Best Foot Forward travels to 35+ cities across the country, and is free to enter. Its purpose to scout and build young skateboarding talent.

Previous Zumiez Best Foot Forward winners have gone on to become some of the top names in skateboarding, including Ishod Wair, Tom Asta, Jack Olson, Chris Wimer, and Alec Majerus.

Zumiez Stash 
Zumiez allows the option of signing up for the "Zumiez Stash". Signing up allows customers to gain points for each purchase made, in stores or online. "The Stash allows you to earn points for exclusive merchandise and experiences for shopping and engaging with us". With stash points earned from purchases, members can then redeem their points for rewards and items only available for purchase with stash points.

Zumiez Foundation
Zumiez began a charitable foundation in 2002, donating clothing to those in need in over 20 states in the United States. In 2012 over 180,000 items were donated to more than 180 organizations around the nation.

Acquisitions
The company purchased the clothing company Fast Forward in 2006, Blue Tomato in 2012, and Fast Times in 2015.

Store shooting
On January 25, 2014, a gunman, identified as 19-year-old Darion Marcus Aguilar, opened fire with a 12 gauge shotgun inside of Zumiez at The Mall in Columbia located in Columbia, Maryland, killing two store employees before taking his own life, according to police. Five other people were injured during the incident. Extra ammunition and crude explosives (all of which were later defused) were found in Aguilar's backpack.

References

External links

 
 Zumiez Inc EDGAR Filing History
 Zumiez investor relations website
 Zumiez Couch Tour website
 Zumiez Best Foot Forward website
 Zumiez Official Facebook page
 Zumiez Official Twitter page
 

Skateboarding companies
Retail companies established in 1978
Companies based in Lynnwood, Washington
Companies listed on the Nasdaq
1978 establishments in Washington (state)